Pelosia muscerda, the dotted footman, is a moth of the family Erebidae. The species was first described by Johann Siegfried Hufnagel in 1766. It is found in the Palearctic realm.

The wingspan is 24–28 mm. The moth flies from June to September depending on the location.

The larvae feed on lichens and algae.

External links
 
 
 
 Fauna Europaea
 Lepidoptera of Belgium
 Lepiforum e.V.
 De Vlinderstichting 

Lithosiina
Moths of Asia
Moths of Europe
Moths of Japan
Moths described in 1766
Taxa named by Johann Siegfried Hufnagel